Stellar Airpark  is a privately-owned public-use  residential airpark located  west of the central business district of Chandler, a city in Maricopa County, Arizona, United States. It is privately owned by the Stellar Runway Utilizers Association, Inc (SRUA). All homeowners, including aircraft owners who base at FBO tiedowns or FBO hangars, are required to pay annual dues to the SRUA to maintain runway facilities.

Facilities and aircraft 
It has one asphalt paved runway, 17/35, measuring 4417 x 80 ft (1346 x 24m).

For the 12-month period ending April 14, 2021, the airport had an average of 110 aircraft operations per day, roughly 40,150, all of which were general aviation. There are 141 aircraft based at this airport: 119 single-engine, 10 jet, 4 multi-engine, 4 helicopters, 3 ultralights, and 1 glider.

References

External links 
 Stellar Runway Utilizers Association
 Stellar Airpark (P19) at Arizona DOT airport directory
 

Residential airparks
Airports in Maricopa County, Arizona